Homer (Dena'ina: Tuggeght) is a city in Kenai Peninsula Borough in the U.S. state of Alaska. According to the 2020 Census, the population is 5,522, up from 5,003 in 2010. Long known as the "Halibut Fishing Capital of the World", Homer is also nicknamed "the end of the road", and more recently,  "the cosmic hamlet by the sea".

Geography 

Homer is located at 59°38'35" North, 151°31'33" West (59.643059, −151.525900). The only road into Homer is the Sterling Highway.

Homer is on the shore of Kachemak Bay on the southwest side of the Kenai Peninsula.

Much of the coastline, as well as the Homer Spit, sank dramatically during the Good Friday earthquake in March 1964.  After the earthquake, very little vegetation was able to survive on the Homer Spit.

Climate 
As with much of South-central Alaska, Homer has a moderate subarctic mediterranean climate (Köppen Dsc), which causes its weather to be moderate compared to interior Alaska. Winters are snowy and long, but not particularly cold, considering the latitude, with the average January high only slightly below freezing. Homer receives only about 25 inches of rainfall annually due to the influence of the Chugach Mountains to the southeast, which shelter it from the Gulf of Alaska. Seven days have a minimum  or below annually, and Homer falls in USDA Plant Hardiness Zones 6a. Summers are cool due to the marine influence, with  maxima or minima remaining at or above  being extremely rare.

Notes

History 

Tiller digs indicate that early Alutiiq people probably camped in the Homer area, although their villages were on the far side of Kachemak Bay.

Coal was discovered in the area in the 1890s.  The Cook Inlet Coal Fields Company built a town, dock, coal mine, and  railroad at Homer.  Coalmining in the area continued until World War II.  It is estimated that 400 million tons of coal deposits are still present in the area.

Homer was named for Homer Pennock, a goldmining company promoter, who arrived in 1896 on the Homer Spit and built living quarters for his crew of 50 men.  However, goldmining was never profitable in the area.

Another earlier settlement, Miller's Landing, was named after a Charles Miller, who homesteaded in the area around 1915. According to local historian Janet Klein, he was an employee of the Alaska Railroad and had wintered company horses on the beach grasses on the Homer Spit.  He built a landing site in a small bight in Kachemak Bay, where supply barges from Seldovia could land and offload their cargos. Miller's landing was legally considered a census-designated place separate from Homer until it was annexed in  2002, but has always been locally considered part of Homer.

Halibut and salmon sport fishing, along with tourism and commercial fishing are the dominant industries. Homer co-hosted the 2006 Arctic Winter Games. The Alaska Maritime National Wildlife Refuge and the Kachemak Bay Research Reserve co-host a visitor center with interpretive displays known as the Alaska Islands and Ocean Visitor Center, and a cultural and historical museum there is called the Pratt Museum.

Demographics

Homer first appeared on the 1940 U.S. Census as an unincorporated village. It formally incorporated in 1964.

As of the 2010 United States Census, there were 5,003 people, 2,235 households, and 1,296 families residing in the city. The racial makeup of the city was 89.3% White, 4.1% American Indian and Alaska Native, 1.0% Asian, 0.4% African American, 0.1% Pacific Islander, 0.6% from other races, and 4.5% from two or more races. Hispanics and Latinos of any race were 2.1% of the population.

There were 2,235 households, of which 27.2% had children under the age of 18 living with them, 44.3% were married couples living together, 9.3% had a female householder with no husband present, 4.3% had a male householder with no wife present, and 42.0% were non-families. 33.7% of all households were made up of individuals, and 11.0% had someone living alone who was 65 years of age or older. The average household size was 2.21, and the average family size was 2.83.

The median age in the city was 44.0 years. 21.9% of residents were under the age of 18; 6.9% were between the ages of 18 and 24; 22.2% were from 25 to 44; 34.5% were from 45 to 64; and 14.5% were 65 years of age or older. The gender makeup of the city was 49.5% male and 50.5% female.

The median income for a household was $52,057, and the median income for a family was $68,455. Males had a median income of $41,581 versus $37,679 for females. The per capita income for the city was $32,035. About 3.8% of families and 7.9% of the population were below the poverty line, including 11.2% of those under age 18 and 1.4% of those age 65 or over.

Education

Formal Education 
The Kenai Peninsula Borough School District provides primary and secondary education to the community of Homer. These schools are:
 Homer High School (9-12)
 Homer Flex High School (9-12)
 Homer Middle School (7-8)
 West Homer Elementary (3-6)
 Paul Banks Elementary (K-2)
 McNeil Canyon Elementary (K-6)
 Fireweed Academy (K-6)
 Connections Homeschool Program (K-12)

The Kachemak Bay Campus of Kenai Peninsula College provides post-secondary education, as well as ESL and GED training to the community of Homer.

The Homer Public Library has enthusiastic support from the Friends of the Homer Library, established in 1948, which raised funds and support for a new library building, opened on September 16, 2006.

Science Education 
Because of the city of Homer's location on the Kenai Peninsula and its abundance of natural resources and marine habitats, there are many public education programs focused on the environment. Some of these educational endeavors include the Alaska Maritime National Wildlife Refuge Visitor Center (also known as the Alaska Island and Ocean Center) and the Center for Alaskan Coastal Studies. Both organizations encourage science education and sponsor many events aimed to teach people of all ages about the ecosystem and conservation. Some of these events include the Kachemak Crane Watch and the Kachemak Bay Science Conference, both sponsored by the Center for Alaskan Coastal Studies.

Kachemak Bay Shorebird Festival 

One of the biggest educational events in Homer is the Kachemak Bay Shorebird festival. The Kachemak Bay Shorebird Festival was first established in 1993 by a group of Homer residents who wished to educate the public about shorebirds and the wetlands the birds inhabit. Today, the festival is sponsored by Alaska Maritime National Wildlife Refuge and the Friends of Alaska National Wildlife Refuges. The festival is held annually in early May when more than 13,000 shorebirds (also called waders) from 25 different species visit the Kachemak Bay area during spring migration. Tourists and Alaskans alike attend the festival and are encouraged to watch the shorebird migration through a variety of land and boat tours in collaboration with the festival.

The Homer and Kachemak Bay areas consist of a variety of different habitats and are rich in food and resources that attract migrating birds. The abundance of diverse habitats such as mud flats, rocky isles, and marshlands enable many different species to thrive in the area.  

Some of the birds that can be seen during the spring migration and the festival include horned puffins, sandhill cranes, and arctic terns. Arctic Terns are famous for flying the longest distance of any migrating bird.

Many of the birds seen during the festival can be identified with the help of published guides that categorize distinguishable features such as, topography, silhouette, size, and color.

One of the special events held at the festival is the Shorebirds Sing: Bird Call Contest. The contest takes place at the Homer Brewing Company. The contest is a lighthearted competition to see who can best mimic the calls of various bird species.

In 2020, the festival was held entirely virtually due to the COVID-19 pandemic and all presentations, speeches, and events were conducted online. The 2021 festival was held both in person and virtually, with events taking place online and face-to-face. The year 2022 will mark the 30th anniversary of the festival.

Media 

Homer has one newspaper, the Homer News, a weekly founded in 1964 and bought in 2000 by Morris Communications.

Homer has a number of radio stations including commercial stations KWVV-FM at 103.5 FM, KGTL at 620 AM, and public radio KBBI at 890 AM.

Homer receives 7 analog television stations: Because the stations are rebroadcast into Homer using repeaters, their channel numbers are not the same in Homer and they were not required to participate in the transition to digital television.
 KTUU-TV Channel 2 - NBC
 KTBY Channel 4 - Fox
 KAKM Channel 7 - PBS
 KAUU Channel 9 - MyNetworkTV
 KTVA Channel 11 - CBS
 KYUR Channel 13 - ABC

Transportation

Homer is the southernmost town on the contiguous Alaska highway system.  It is also part of the Alaska Marine Highway (the Alaskan ferry system).  The regional airport lies near the coast as well, with  local air taxis and regular scheduled commercial flights to Anchorage.  Homer erected its first traffic light in 2005.

The United States Coast Guard currently stations six Island Class cutters in Alaska, including one in Homer.
From February 7, 1992, to June 4, 2015, the USCGC Roanoke Island was assigned to Homer.  She was retired early, and was replaced by the Sapelo.  The Sapelo is scheduled to be replaced by a more modern Sentinel-class cutter.

The Coast Guard leases an anchorage on the Homer Spit.
The Coast Guard renewed its lease for 20 years in 2015.

Government
Homer uses a city council consisting of seven members. As of April 2020, the current mayor of Homer is Ken Castner.

Notable people

 Tom Bodett (born 1955), spokesperson, known for the Motel 6 "We'll leave the light on for you" advertisements; and writer, known for the whimsical book about Homer, As Far as You Can go Without a Passport
 Lincoln Brewster (born 1971), Christian worship musician
 Kristen Faulkner (born 1992), professional cyclist
 Hazel P. Heath (1909–1998), businesswoman; mayor of Homer, 1968–1976
 Jewel (Jewel Kilcher) (born 1974), singer/songwriter
 Jean Keene (1923–2009), the "Eagle Lady" of Homer, known for her decades-long history of feeding bald eagles on Homer Spit
 Andre Marrou (born 1938), was a resident of Homer when he was elected as a Libertarian member to the Alaska House of Representatives in 1984
 Shannyn Moore (born 1970), political writer based in Alaska
 Tela O'Donnell (born 1982), Olympic wrestler
 Ambrose Olsen (1985–2010), male fashion model

See also

 Mile 17 fire
 Fritz Creek
 Diamond Ridge
 Kachemak City

References

External links 
 
 
 
 
 Homer Chamber of Commerce Webpage

 
Archaeological sites in Alaska
Cities in Alaska
Cities in Kenai Peninsula Borough, Alaska
Mining communities in Alaska
Populated coastal places in Alaska on the Pacific Ocean